James Joseph McClean (born 22 April 1989) is an Irish professional footballer who plays as a winger for EFL Championship club Wigan Athletic and the Republic of Ireland national team.

McClean played with Trojans, Institute, his hometown club Derry City, and Sunderland before moving to Wigan Athletic in August 2013. He spent two seasons at Wigan, claiming their player of the year award in the latter, and then returned to the Premier League by joining West Bromwich Albion in June 2015. McClean spent three season with the Baggies before joining Stoke City in July 2018. McClean re-signed for Wigan Athletic in August 2021.

McClean was born and brought up in Derry and played for the Northern Ireland national under-21 football team, but declined a call-up to the senior squad because he wanted to play for the Republic of Ireland. In February 2012, McClean received international clearance from FIFA which made him eligible to play for the Republic of Ireland, making his debut against the Czech Republic in the same month. He has since represented the nation at UEFA Euro 2012 and UEFA Euro 2016.

Early life
McClean grew up in the Creggan area of Derry and attended Holy Family Primary School and St. Peter's High School. He played Gaelic football with Seán Dolans GAC before concentrating on association football.

Club career

Institute
McClean began his career at Institute, making one first team appearance as a substitute against Glentoran in the 2007–08 Irish Premier League season. Institute decided not to renew his contract in the summer of 2008.

Derry City
McClean made his Derry City first team debut on 1 July 2008 in a League Cup tie at home to Bohemians, opening the scoring in a 4–1 win. He made his League of Ireland debut for Derry City as a substitute for Kevin McHugh playing against Cork City at Turner's Cross on 8 September 2008. In his first full season with Derry in the 2009 season the club suffered serious financial problems and the players went weeks without payment. During this period in November 2009 McClean held talks with English League Two side Lincoln City, but this did not result in a contract, after McClean felt homesick. Derry finished the season in 4th place but were expelled by the FAI due to breaking regulations by holding secondary, unofficial contracts with players. They were invited to join the League of Ireland First Division.

In December 2009 McClean was one of the first four players to sign for the new Derry City, along with David McDaid, and the McEleney brothers — Shane and Patrick. McClean scored eight goals in 33 appearances in the 2010 season helping Derry return to the top-flight. McClean began to attract more interest from English clubs in the 2011 season with Peterborough United making some unsuccessful bids. He also attracted interest from Everton. In August 2011 Derry accepted an offer from Sunderland for McClean.

Sunderland

McClean joined Sunderland on 9 August 2011 for a fee of £350,000, signing a three-year contract. Upon signing McClean, manager Steve Bruce indicated that he was "one for the future", and also hinted that he would be in the reserve team until Christmas. His form in the development squad was capped by a reserve-debut goal in a 4–3 win over Tyne–Wear derby rivals Newcastle United, earning him a place on the Sunderland bench. Despite never making an appearance under Bruce, he made his debut for the first team in Martin O'Neill's first game in charge on 11 December, a 2–1 win over Blackburn Rovers and was credited for the comeback which saw his side overturn a 1–0 deficit, after coming on as a substitute for Jack Colback in the second half.

McClean made his first start for Sunderland in their 1–0 victory over Manchester City on 1 January 2012, and scored his first senior goal for the Black Cats in a 4–1 win against Wigan Athletic two days later; on 8 January, he scored and assisted Sebastian Larsson in a 2–0 win at Peterborough United in the third round of the FA Cup. McClean provided the assist for Stéphane Sessègnon's opening goal in Sunderland's 2–0 victory over Swansea City on 21 January, and got another assist in the equalising goal for Fraizer Campbell in the next round of the cup against Middlesbrough on 29 January. Ahead of the replay for that fixture, Middlesbrough manager Tony Mowbray used McClean as an example for young players to follow. McClean turned provider again in Sunderland's 3–0 victory over Norwich City, assisting Sessègnon's goal, then scored the only goal in a win over Stoke City on 4 February in snowy conditions at the Britannia Stadium. A week later, he opened the scoring in Sunderland's 2–1 home loss to Arsenal after Per Mertesacker injured himself. On 23 March, Sunderland announced that McClean had signed a new contract intended to force him to stay at the club until the summer of 2015. A day later, he helped them to a 3–1 victory over relegation-threatened Queens Park Rangers by assisting the opening goal for Nicklas Bendtner and later scoring by himself. McClean won Sunderland's Young Player of the Year Award, at the end of the 2011–12 season.

In August 2012, McClean scored his first two goals of the 2012–13 in the second round of the League Cup against Morecambe. He also scored in the third round as well, scoring in the 82nd minute away at Milton Keynes Dons. He scored his first Premier League goal of the season in a 3–0 home defeat of Reading on 11 December, exactly twelve months to the day that he made his Sunderland debut. McClean fell out of favour with the Sunderland supporters after he refused to wear a poppy which led to his departure in August 2013. Speaking in 2015 McClean says he was 'hung out to dry' by Sunderland.

Wigan Athletic
McClean signed for Championship club Wigan Athletic on a three-year contract on 8 August 2013. Three days later he made his debut in the 2013 FA Community Shield at Wembley Stadium, starting in a 2–0 loss to Manchester United.

He scored his first goal for Wigan on 26 January 2014 in the FA Cup fourth round, a winner in a 2–1 victory against Crystal Palace. He had scored on 18 December against Sheffield Wednesday, but that match was abandoned in heavy rain and his goal was struck from the records; it was the only goal of the game by the 59th minute in which it was called off. McClean played in 49 matches in 2013–14, scoring four goals as Wigan reached the Championship play-offs where they lost 2–1 to Queens Park Rangers. The 2014–15 was a poor one for the Latics as they finished in 23rd place were relegated to League One.

West Bromwich Albion

Turning down a move to New York Red Bulls, on 22 June 2015 McClean signed for West Bromwich Albion on a three-year deal for a fee believed to be around £1.5 million. In July, on the team's tour of the United States, he turned his back on the Flag of England while the British national anthem "God Save the Queen" was played before a match against the Charleston Battery, which resulted in a verbal warning from manager Tony Pulis.

He made his competitive debut on 10 August as West Brom began the season against Manchester City at The Hawthorns. Booed by his team's own fans whenever he touched the ball, he was replaced by Claudio Yacob at half-time, as his team lost 3–0. On 17 October, after a 1–0 home win over his former team Sunderland, he taunted the visiting fans, leading to confrontations between both sets of players; he was given a warning by the FA over his conduct. He scored his first goal for the Baggies on 5 December, a 39th-minute headed equaliser in a 1–1 home draw against Tottenham Hotspur. Two weeks later, he was sent off in the first half of a 2–1 home loss to Bournemouth for a challenge on Adam Smith; teammate Salomón Rondón was also dismissed in added time. He played in 42 matches in 2015–16 as West Brom finished in 14th position.

He scored his first goal of the 2016–17 season in the EFL Cup against Northampton Town. His first league goal of the season came in a 4–2 win over West Ham United on 17 September 2016. He was given an improved contract extension until 2019, with the option of a further year. Tony Pulis said: "James thoroughly deserves this and has worked hard to achieve it." He angered Watford captain Troy Deeney with his tackling in a 3–1 win on 3 December 2016. He played 42 times as the Baggies finished in 10th. The 2017–18 season was an unsettled one for West Brom as they went through four managers Tony Pulis, Gary Megson, Alan Pardew and Darren Moore. Albion were rock bottom of the Premier League nearly all season and despite a late resurgence they were relegated to the Championship.

Stoke City
McClean joined Stoke City in July 2018 on a four-year contract for a fee of £5 million. McClean made his Stoke debut on 5 August 2018 against Leeds United. He scored his first goal for Stoke on 25 August 2018 in a 2–0 win against Hull City. In September 2018 McClean suffered a broken arm whilst on international duty with Ireland. McClean played 45 times in 2018–19, scoring three goals as Stoke finished in 16th place. McClean began the 2019–20 season playing as a makeshift left-back as Nathan Jones attempted to implement his preferred diamond formation. It did not work as Stoke had a poor start to the season, failing to win any of their first ten matches and Jones was replaced by Michael O'Neill in November who played McClean in his natural left-wing position. McClean became a key player under O'Neill and his form helped the team pick up results to move out of the relegation zone. He ended the campaign with seven goals from 37 appearances as Stoke avoided relegation and finished in 15th position. Following the end of the season he was voted Player of the Year by supporters.

In the 2020–21 season, McClean made 29 appearances, scoring two goals as Stoke finished in 14th position. During the season McClean had disciplinary problems as he breached Covid-19 protocols by going to a gym during lockdown. He also angered O'Neill in March 2021 after he played for Ireland despite recovering from a foot injury.

Return to Wigan Athletic
On 17 August 2021 McClean re-joined Wigan Athletic on a one-year contract. McClean claimed he turned down Bolton Wanderers in order to sign for Wigan however Bolton Manager Ian Evatt stated this was false, Bolton had no interest in signing McClean, and McClean's agent had rung daily for three weeks begging Bolton to give him a contract. On 16 October he scored twice in a 4–0 win against Bolton with the match nearly being abandoned after he scored when Bolton fans threw bottles and other objects at him, followed by Wigan fans ripping down advertising boards, the match stopping for more than 10 minutes as police dealt with the situation. Having been promoted as Champions, McClean signed a new one-year contract extension at the end of the 2021–22 season. His first goal of the new season came on 6 August 2022, in a 1–1 draw away to Norwich City at Carrow Road.

International career
McClean had represented Northern Ireland at a number of junior levels, but ultimately opted to represent the Republic of Ireland at senior level.

Northern Ireland
McClean was part of the Northern Ireland team that won the 2008 Milk Cup and scored in the opening game in a 3–1 win against the US. He has also represented Northern Ireland seven times at Under 21 level. On 26 July 2011 he was called up to the Northern Ireland senior squad for the match against the Faroe Islands on 10 August 2011. McClean decided to wait for selection by the Republic of Ireland and therefore pulled out of the Northern Ireland squad. In January 2012 he again confirmed he would not be reconsidering his decision although Northern Ireland manager Michael O'Neill had been in contact with him.

Republic of Ireland

McClean's success in the Premier League saw increasing calls for Giovanni Trapattoni to select him for the Republic of Ireland, with Sunderland manager Martin O'Neill saying after McClean's winning goal at Stoke: "I think he's more than capable of going to Euro 2012 ... Hopefully he's making such an impact he'll be watched by someone in the Ireland camp, even if it's not Trapattoni. They couldn't fail to be impressed." McClean received international clearance to play for the Republic of Ireland on 9 February. However, he was not included in the squad for the match against the Czech Republic which was announced the next day, though he was added to the squad on 20 February after success against Arsenal in the FA Cup Fifth Round Proper.

McClean made his international debut on 29 February 2012, coming on in the 78th minute for Aiden McGeady in a friendly against the Czech Republic at the Aviva Stadium. On 7 May 2012, manager Giovanni Trapattoni confirmed that McClean was part of the Irish UEFA Euro 2012 squad. He then received sectarian abuse and death threats via Twitter. McClean was quoted saying, "You are looking around as a Catholic and seeing all the Union Jacks and listening to the fans' songs and I just didn't feel at home at all." On 26 May 2012, McClean made his first senior international start against Bosnia and Herzegovina in the final home friendly ahead of UEFA Euro 2012, playing on the left flank.

On 10 June 2012, the date of Ireland's first UEFA Euro 2012 match in Poland, McClean was left on the bench; the game ended in a 3–1 defeat to Croatia. Two days before Ireland's next match on 14 June 2012, Ireland manager Trapattoni hinted that McClean would not feature in that game against world champions Spain. After much public urging for Trapattoni to make use of McClean's talents to recover Ireland's progress in the European Championship, Trapattoni claimed that "His time would come in the future". However, on 14 June 2012, McClean appeared as a substitute against Spain, coming on in the 76th minute in Gdańsk, Poland.

On 7 September 2012, after being left on the bench during Ireland's 2–1 victory over Kazakhstan in a World Cup 2014 qualifier, McClean used Twitter to criticise Trapattoni. The tweet, and McClean's account, were subsequently deleted and the winger was forced to apologise to teammates.

On 11 June 2014, McClean scored his first international goal in the 5–1 defeat by Portugal in the MetLife Stadium during Ireland's US tour. On 11 October McClean made his first appearance of the UEFA Euro 2016 qualifying campaign against Gibraltar, scoring a brace in a 7–0 win in the Aviva Stadium.

On 29 March 2016, he scored his first ever professional penalty, helping Ireland to a 2–2 draw in a friendly against Slovakia. On 9 October 2017, he scored the only goal of a win away to Wales at the Cardiff City Stadium in 2018 FIFA World Cup qualification, putting the Irish into the playoffs.

On 16 November 2020, the Football Association of Ireland announced that McClean had tested positive for COVID-19 after playing a full game against Wales at the Cardiff City Stadium. The announcement also included Matt Doherty's positive result.

On 14 June 2022, on his 94th cap for Ireland, he captained his country for the first time, in a 1–1 draw with Ukraine in a UEFA Nations League game at the LKS Stadium in Poland.

Personal life
McClean began a relationship with Erin Connor in 2010. They married in 2016, in their hometown of Derry. As of July 2022, they are expecting their fourth child.

In 2013, McClean, of Sunderland at the time, attracted criticism when he wrote a tweet naming "The Broad Black Brimmer" as his favorite song by The Wolfe Tones. The song is associated with physical force Irish republicanism. As a result of his tweet, his club manager, Martin O'Neill, advised him to stop using Twitter.

Since his move to English football in 2012, McClean and his family have received anti-Irish abuse, both in person and on social media.

Remembrance poppy controversy 
Since his Premier League breakthrough in 2012, McClean has been both condemned and supported for his ongoing refusal to wear football shirts bearing the symbol of the remembrance poppy when playing games on or around Remembrance Day (11 November) or Remembrance Sunday (the nearest Sunday), leading to his being named by the BBC in 2015 as the main example for one of the "Five reasons people don't wear poppies". The special shirts, usually auctioned, are part of the annual Poppy Appeal organised by the Royal British Legion, with all Premier League club shirts displaying poppies in various forms since 2010.

McClean states his objection derives from his affinity with Derry and to the role of the British Army in The Troubles. He grew up on the Creggan estate, where six of the men shot dead on Bloody Sunday in 1972 came from. He stated he would wear the poppy if it were restricted to honouring only soldiers who died in the World Wars, many of whom, particularly during World War I, were Irish, and has insisted his position is one of peace, and not any kind of wider political, religious or anti-British point. The Legion opposes compelling people to wear the poppy, seeing such a stance as going against everything the poppy symbolises.

For his stances, McClean has been booed by supporters of opposition clubs as well as some of his own club's supporters. After the first refusal, McClean was subjected to sectarian abuse and loyalist threats, including death threats.

Various players, such as David Meyler and Jamie Devitt (both Irish citizens) and managers (including Trapattoni), have voiced support for his decision as a personal issue of conscience. The first instance occurred on 10 November 2012, with McClean wearing a plain Sunderland shirt during their match against Everton. McClean donated his unadorned shirt, signed, to a charity auction in aid of a Dublin-based children's charity.

Philanthropy
McClean has made a number of charitable donations. He made a significant donation to homeless people at the Wells and Foyle Valley House in Derry. He donated £1,500 for a custom hand cycle bike to help a child who was suffering from Spina Bifida. He made another significant donation to the Wells facility in the Bogside, for up to 24 men who have alcohol problems. He paid £1,750 for a new mobile home after hearing about a pregnant homeless woman's struggles on social media. He donated £1,000 to help pay for specialist proton therapy in Florida for a four-year-old child suffering from cancer. He donated €1,200 to help pay for the funeral of a two-year-old boy who was struck by a car. In December 2016 he set up a new clothing line with proceeds going to help homeless residents of his native Derry. He donated £500 to an online fund set up to support the family of a missing Derry man.

Career statistics

Club

International

Scores and results list Republic of Ireland's goal tally first, score column indicates score after each McClean goal.

Honours
Derry City
League of Ireland First Division: 2010

Wigan Athletic
EFL League One: 2021–22

Individual
PFAI First Division Team of the Year: 2010
Sunderland Young Player of the Year: 2011–12
Wigan Player of the Year: 2014–15
RTÉ Sports Person of the Year: 2017
Stoke City Player of the Year: 2020

See also
 List of Republic of Ireland international footballers born outside the Republic of Ireland

References

External links

James McClean at Football Association of Ireland

1989 births
Living people
Sportspeople from Derry (city)
Association footballers from Northern Ireland
Republic of Ireland association footballers
Association football wingers
Institute F.C. players
Derry City F.C. players
Sunderland A.F.C. players
Wigan Athletic F.C. players
West Bromwich Albion F.C. players
Stoke City F.C. players
NIFL Premiership players
League of Ireland players
League of Ireland XI players
Premier League players
English Football League players
Northern Ireland under-21 international footballers
Republic of Ireland international footballers
Republic of Ireland international footballers from Northern Ireland
UEFA Euro 2012 players
UEFA Euro 2016 players